Nuclear factor of kappa light polypeptide gene enhancer in B-cells inhibitor, delta also known as IκBNS is a protein in humans that is encoded by the NFKBID gene.

IκBNS is a member of the atypical inhibitors of NF-κB (also called the nuclear IκBs). NF-κB is a transcription factor, which regulates the expression of its target genes, depending on intracellular and extracellular signals. As NFKBID influences the impact of NF-κB on several genes, it is involved in cellular responses to stimuli such as stress and bacterial or viral antigens.

Structure 

NFKBID is a nuclear protein with 327 amino acids. It contains six ankyrin repeats (ANKs), that are surrounded by a nuclear localization signal sequence (NLS) at the N-terminus and a short C-terminus. The ANKs are characteristic for all IκB proteins. The NLS is an additional characteristic structural element of only atypical IκB proteins, which is responsible for the localization of the protein into the nucleus. In contrast, classical inhibitors, e.g. IκBα and IκBβ, are located in the cytoplasm. A high resolution structure of NFKBID is not available yet.

Function 

It seems that NFKBID acts as an inhibitor of the NF-κB cascade. By its functions, including promotion of germinal center reactions and its requirement in immunosuppressive regulatory T cell generation, NFKBID regulates homeostasis of the immune system and has further different consequences on it. Furthermore, NFKBID influences B cells and plasma cells substantially, concerning their functions and development.

The expression of NFKBID is precisely regulated. After NF-κB activation atypical IκBs are induced by the transcription factor  Atypical IκBs, in turn, can regulate the NF-κB transcription as either inducers or inhibitors. In contrast, the classical proteins can only repress NF-κB transcription.
In mature T cells (CD4+), T cell receptor (TCR) stimulation can induce the expression of NFKBID, whereas in macrophages, TLR ligands take on this task.

To influence the transcription of genes, NFKBID has some interaction protein partners. It was reported that NFKBID interacts with p50, which is a subunit of NF-κB, p52, p65, RelB, and c-Rel. NFKBID binds these proteins only in the nucleus, except for p50, which can be bound both in the cytoplasm and in the nucleus 
Researchers suggest that apart from this, NFKBID can also interact with homo- and heterodimers consisting of some of these subunits, e.g. p50/p50 and p65/p50. Depending on the target gene and on which protein is bound by NFKBID, it can function as both repressor and activator.

References